Daag (Bengali: দাগ) is a 2022 Bangladeshi Social film directed by Sanjoy Somadder. The film stars Mosharraf Karim and Tahiya Tazeen Khan Aisha in lead roles.

Cast
Mosharraf Karim as Alamgir
Tahiya Tazeen Khan Aisha as mother
Nishat Priom
Shomu Chowdhury
Shilpi Sharkar Apu
Naresh Bhuiyan
Mili Basher
Masum Basher

Plot

Release
The film has been released digitally on Chorki on 10 November 2022.

Reception

References

2022 films